Alexander Vasilyevich Bogomaz (born 23 February 1961) is a Russian politician who is serving as the Governor of Bryansk Oblast since 2015 (acting 2014–2015).

Biography
Born on February 23, 1961, in the village of Gridenki, Starodubsky District, Bryansk Oblast. His mother, Nadezhda Filippovna, was a primary school teacher, school principal and his father graduated from the construction college, then the Starodubsky Pedagogical School and participated in the Great Patriotic War. After army service he graduated from a military school, then a pedagogical institute in Novozybkov. He worked as a teacher at school, taught Russian, literature, drawing, labor, German. Has three older sisters.

He began his career in 1977 as a turner on CNC machine tools at the Bryansk Road Machine Plant. Between 1983 and 1998 he worked at the Burnovichi state farm in the Starodubsky District of the Bryansk Oblast, having gone from engineer to deputy director. From 1998 - 2003 - Chief Engineer of PU Starodubraygaz of JSC Bryanskoblgaz. Between 2009 - 2012 - Head of the peasant farm "Bogomaz O. A.". From 2003 to 2004 he was First Deputy Head of the Administration of the Starodubsky District of the Bryansk Oblast. From 2004 to 2009, he was elected as a deputy of representative bodies of local self-government in the Starodubsky District of the Bryansk Oblast in single-member constituencies. He was elected as a deputy of the Melensky rural settlement in the single-mandate constituency No. 1, head of the Melensky rural settlement - the chairman of the Melensky village Council of People's Deputies, deputy of the Starodubsky District Council of People's Deputies in the single-member constituency No. 18. On March 1, 2009, at the elections of deputies of the Bryansk Oblast Duma, he was elected in single-member constituency No. 28 (Starodubsky), gaining 63.1% of the vote.

In July - August 2011, in anticipation of the State Duma elections in the Bryansk Oblast, as well as in other regions of the country, the United Russia party and the All-Russian Popular Front conducted primaries to select candidates from the ONF for inclusion in the party's personnel reserve for the purpose of nominations by candidates for deputies of the State Duma on the party list of "United Russia". Alexander Bogomaz and his wife Olga took part in these primaries. Both were nominated by BRO “Farmers of the Bryansk Region” (AKKOR). Alexander was nominated as the chairman of the board of directors of the Potato Alliance LLC, and Olga as the head of the peasant (farmer's) farm “Bogomaz O. A.” Starodubsky district. According to the results of the primaries, Alexander Bogomaz took 6th place.

State Duma deputy
In September, United Russia formed an election list, which included Alexander Bogomaz. In the regional group "Bryansk Oblast" he went at number 3 after the current State Duma deputies Andrei Bocharov and Yekaterina Lakhova.

In the elections to the State Duma of the 6th convocation held on December 4, 2011, United Russia gained 50.12% of the vote in the Bryansk Oblast and received 2 deputy mandates. Thus, Bogomaz did not get into the State Duma. However, less than a year later, on October 16, 2012, Andrei Bocharov resigned the deputy's mandate. The vacant mandate was transferred to Alexander Bogomaz on October 31. In the State Duma, he worked as part of the committee on science and high technology and the committee on agricultural issues. In September 2014, he resigned from the deputy because he became governor of Bryansk Oblast. The vacant mandate was handed over to Viktor Malashenko.

Governor of the Bryansk Oblast
On September 9, 2014, Russian President Vladimir Putin appointed Alexander Bogomaz as interim governor of the Bryansk Oblast. On March 19, 2015, Bogomaz submitted all the necessary documents for participating in the gubernatorial elections.

On August 4, he was registered as a candidate for the Bryansk Oblast Election Commission as a candidate for governor of the Bryansk Oblast. On September 13, 2015, he was elected governor of the Bryansk Oblast, gaining 79, 96% of the vote. On September 28, 2015, officially took office. From August 2, 2019, to January 27, 2020, he was a member of the Presidium of the State Council of the Russian Federation.

References

1961 births
Living people
People from Bryansk Oblast
United Russia politicians
Sixth convocation members of the State Duma (Russian Federation)
Governors of Bryansk Oblast